Lotus Jazz is an integrated suite of word processor, spreadsheet, database, graphics, and communication software designed for the Macintosh 512K. The name evokes a group of musicians who together create something larger than each of the individual players.

The Lotus 1-2-3 spreadsheet was the killer application for the business-oriented IBM PC, and Jazz was an attempt to recreate that success for Macintosh. With the tagline "The software Macintosh was invented for," and promoted on TV at great expense, it was poorly received by reviewers and consumers and became a high-profile flop. In 1988, Lotus was on the verge of releasing an improved version as Modern Jazz, but the project was cancelled.

Overview
Jazz shipped on four 400K 3½" diskettes: one for start-up, one containing the main program, a copy protected backup program disk, and a disk of sample files. This required the need for multiple swaps of the start-up and program or backup disks. Lotus Jazz Release 1 cannot be run from a hard drive or dual 400K floppy disk drives. If the start-up or both of the main program disks failed, the software is unusable.

The terminal emulation module is integrated with the spreadsheet module, allowing users dialing into corporate mainframes to have onscreen reports be parsed directly into spreadsheet columns for later editing and refinement.

Reception
Lotus sold 20,000 copies of the original version of Jazz, while Microsoft sold 200,000 of Excel. 

In an extensive Macworld review in 1985, Gordon McComb wrote, "It is well thought out, but has both strong and weak points." He pointed out missing features, such as macros, split windows, and linking spreadsheets together. He cited working within the tight memory limitations as a significant drawback: 

Creative Computing's John J. Anderson wrote, "There is nothing wrong with Jazz that a few healthy software revisions can't patch. Then again, not much of it is really right, either—right in the way it really should have been if it could have been." He called out the $600 price tag and the 512K RAM limit of the Mac as major issues.

Retrospective
In 2014, Lotus co-founder Mitch Kapor said, "We were doing business products, and a spreadsheet was an enterprise product. The Mac in 1985 and the enterprise was a complete nonstarter." He summarized some of the development and promotion mistakes:

John C. Dvorak blamed the failure of Jazz on the high price, copy protection, not calling the product 1-2-3, weak import/export functions, and a misguided ad campaign.

References

1985 software
Classic Mac OS software
Jazz
Office suites